Harald Frei (born 1 May 1951) is an Australian former first-class cricketer who represented Queensland.

Frei appeared six times for Australian rules football club Footscray during the 1973 VFL season. 

In 1978, Frei played for Lockhart Football Club in the Farrer Football League and played in the NSW Football Championships.

He later played football in the La Trobe Valley Football League and with the North Launceston Football Club, before moving to Brisbane where he played cricket for Toombul District Cricket Club.

It was not until the age of 31 that he made his first-class cricket debut, picked to play against a Bob Willis led England XI. In a match that Queensland won, he dismissed the Test player Graeme Fowler for single figures in both innings and as well as David Gower twice. Even though he was picked primarily as a fast-medium bowler, he managed to top score for Queensland in their first innings. His 57 runs, which came off just 36 deliveries and included five sixes, ended when he was bowled by Norman Cowans.

As a result of his strong showing against England, Frei made his Sheffield Shield debut the following week and went on to take 20 wickets at 38.75 for the 1982/83 season. He performed better in Queensland's 1983/84 Shield campaign with 23 wickets at 24.08, helping them to their first final, which they lost to Western Australia. Frei took 30 wickets and played in another final in 1985/86 before his form began deteriorating. He managed just eight wickets at 67.37 the following season and never represented Queensland again.

References

External links

1951 births
Living people
Australian cricketers
Queensland cricketers
Australian rules footballers from Queensland
Western Bulldogs players
North Launceston Football Club players
Kedron Football Club players
Mayne Australian Football Club players
German cricketers
Sportspeople from Nuremberg
German emigrants to Australia